The 2010–11 Arema Indonesia season is Arema Indonesia's 23rd competitive season. The club will compete in Indonesia League 1, AFC Champions League and Indonesian Community Shield. Arema Indonesia a professional football club based in Malang, East Java, Indonesia. The season covers the period from 1 July 2010 to 30 June 2011.

Players

Current squad

Indonesian Community Shield

Indonesia Super League

League table

AFC Champions League

Group stage

<onlyinclude>

Notes

References 

Arema FC seasons
Indonesian football clubs 2010–11 season